Wings of Heaven Live is a live album by the English rock band Magnum, released in 2008 by SPV.

The album was recorded on the 20th anniversary tour of Magnum's Wings of Heaven album. The original album was released in 1988 and reached the Top 5 in the UK album charts achieving Silver status in the UK for over 200,000 sales. The album was recorded on the Wings of Heaven Live UK tour, 10 November 2007 – 18 November 2007. The song "Different Worlds" was performed live for the very first time during this tour, and was never played by the band on the original Wings of Heaven tour in 1988.

The artwork was illustrated by Rodney Matthews following his sleeve design for Magnum's previous album Princess Alice and the Broken Arrow.

The album is dedicated to Kex Gorin, Magnum's original drummer, who died on 21 December 2007.

Track listing

Personnel
Tony Clarkin – guitar
Bob Catley – vocals
Al Barrow – bass guitar
Mark Stanway – keyboards
Harry James – drums

Wings of Heaven Live tour
First leg (UK)
10 November 2007 – Ironworks, Inverness
11 November 2007 – The Garage, Glasgow
12 November 2007 – 53 Degrees, Preston
14 November 2007 – The Junction, Cambridge
15 November 2007 – Picturedrome, Holmfirth
17 November 2007 – The Academy, Birmingham
18 November 2007 – Astoria 2, London
10 December 2007 – Robin 2 (Kex Gorin benefit concert), Wolverhampton

Second leg (UK)
7 May 2008 – Academy, Bristol
8 May 2008 – Wulfrun Hall, Wolverhampton
9 May 2008 – Academy, Newcastle
10 May 2008 – Academy, Oxford
11 May 2008 – Academy, Manchester
12 May 2008 – Academy, Sheffield

Third leg (Europe)
15 May 2008 – Z7, Pratteln, Switzerland
16 May 2008 – Scala, Ludwigsburg, Germany
17 May 2008 – Matrix, Bochum, Germany
18 May 2008 – Fabrik, Hamburg, Germany
19 May 2008 – Colos Saal, Aschaffenburg, Germany
21 May 2008 – Elsterhalle, Munich, Germany
22 May 2008 – Hirsch, Nurnberg, Germany
23 May 2008 – Capitol, Hannover, Germany
24 May 2008 – Postbahnhof, Berlin, Germany
25 May 2008 – Retro Music Hall, Prague, Czech Republic

Fourth leg (festivals)
4 July 2008 – Unterempfenbach open Air, Unterempfenbach, Germany
5 July 2008 – Tentfestival, Tuttlingen, Germany
26 July 2008 – Rock And Blues Festival, Derby, UK

Wings of Heaven live set
Set 1
"When We Were Younger"
"Back Street Kid"
"Out of the Shadows"
"Like Brothers We Stand"
"How Far Jerusalem"
"Dragons Are Real"
"Les Morts Dansant"
"All England's Eyes"
"Vigilante"
"Kingdom of Madness"

Set 2
"Days of No Trust"
"Wild Swan"
"Start Talking Love"
"One Step Away"
"It Must Have Been Love"
"Different Worlds"
"Pray for the Day"
"Don't Wake the Lion (Too Old To Die Young)"

Encore
"Sacred Hour"

References

External links
 www.magnumonline.co.uk — Official Magnum site
 Record Covers — at rodneymatthews.com

Albums produced by Tony Clarkin
Magnum (band) live albums
2008 live albums
SPV/Steamhammer live albums
Albums with cover art by Rodney Matthews